The Ben Webster Prize is an annual jazz award set up by the Ben Webster Foundation to honour Danish and American jazz musicians as well as other professionals active in the promotion of jazz in those countries. The American jazz musician Ben Webster spent his last ten years in Copenhagen, Denmark, where he became an active part of the city's thriving jazz scene. After his death, the Ben Webster Foundation was set up to channel his annual royalties to musicians in Denmark and America. The Ben Webster Prize is part of this effort.

The prize is handed out at an award ceremony in connection with a special concert which has taken place at various jazz venues, including the Jazzhus Montmartre, Huset, the Lake Pavilion, Copenhagen Jazzhouse, the Queen's Hall at the Royal Danish Library, Freetown Christiania's Jazzklub, Sofies Kælderen and Tivoli Gardens. The winner currently receives DKK 25,000.

Winners

Ben Webster's Prize of Honour 
1984 - Børge Roger Henrichsen
1989 - Papa Bue
1995 - Ole Fessor Lindgreen
1996 - Svend Asmussen
2002 - Hugo Rasmussen
2003 - Arnvid Meyer
2006 - Ed Thigpen
2007 - Erik Moseholm
2009 - Lars Thorborg
2010 - Ray Pitts
2011 - Anders Stefansen
2012 - Klaus Albrectsen
2013 - Palle Mikkelborg
2014 - Tove Enevoldsen
2015 - Vincent Nilsson
2016 - Ole Streenberg
2017 - Jens Søndergaard
2019 - Pierre Dørge - Finn Odderskov
2020 - Elith "Nulle" Nykjær
2022 - Ann Farholt, Ole Olsen, Henrik Bay, Leonardo Pedersen, Mikkel Find, Jens Jefsen, Kjeld Lauritsen, Niels "Flipper" Stuart

See also
 Danish jazz

References

Awards established in 1977
Danish music awards
Jazz awards
Danish jazz